1994 in professional wrestling describes the year's events in the world of professional wrestling.

List of notable promotions 
These promotions held notable shows in 1994.

Calendar of notable shows

January

February

March

April

May

June

July

August

September

October

November

December

Notable events
 January 27 – Bobby Heenan made his WCW debut at the Clash of the Champions XXVI.
 March 12 – WCW Power Hour aired its last episode on TBS and it was replaced by WCW Pro the following week.
 May 1 – Rick Rude suffers a career-ending injury during a match vs Sting for the WCW International World Heavyweight title in Fukuoka, Japan when he injured his back landing on a raised platform surrounding the ring.
 June 10 – Hulk Hogan made his WCW debut on WCW Saturday Night.
 July 17 – Hulk Hogan vs Ric Flair finally headlined a Pay-Per-View event at WCW Bash at the Beach (1994).
 July 22 – The jury acquitted WWF Owner Vince McMahon of the charges of distributing steroids to his wrestlers.
 August 4 – Eric Bischoff fires Jesse Ventura for allegedly falling asleep during a WCW Worldwide TV taping at Disney MGM Studios although it has been speculated that the move may have had more to do with Hogan's arrival shortly before.
 August 27 – Moments after winning the NWA World Heavyweight Championship Shane Douglas throws down the NWA title and christens the ECW Heavyweight Championship as a world title.
 August 28 – NWA Eastern Championship Wrestling officially secedes from the National Wrestling Alliance folding NWA Eastern Championship Wrestling and relaunching as Extreme Championship Wrestling.
 September 18 – Ricky Steamboat suffering from a back injury forfeited the WCW United States Heavyweight title to Steve Austin at WCW Fall Brawl (1994) which lost it to Hacksaw Jim Duggan in 35 seconds.
 September 23 The GWF based in Dallas, Texas closes its doors after three years in operation.
 October 16 – WWF All-American Wrestling aired its last episode on the USA Network. it was replaced by WWF Action Zone the following week.
 October 31 – Randy Savage made his final appearance on WWF TV on WWF Monday Night Raw saving Lex Luger from an attack from Bob Backlund.
 December 3 – After his WWF contract ended Randy Savage made his WCW TV debut on a live edition of WCW Saturday Night.

Accomplishments and tournaments

ECW

WCW

WCW Hall of Fame

WWF

WWF Hall of Fame

Slammy Awards

Awards and honors

Pro Wrestling Illustrated

Wrestling Observer Newsletter

Title changes

ECW

FMW

NJPW

WCW

WWF

Births
March 10 – JoJo Offerman
March 25 - Principe Aéreo (died in 2020)
March 26 - Paige VanZant
April 14 – Tian Bing
April 29 - Nash Carter 
May 16 - Omos 
June 8 – Liv Morgan
June 10 – Deonna Purrazzo
June 16 – Rezar
August 12 - Jeniver Bryan Adam
November 11 – Lio Rush
November 15 – Tegan Nox 
November 23 – Aliyah
December 22 - Calvin Tankman

Debuts
 Uncertain debut date
 Mikey Whipwreck
 D'Lo Brown
 Big Show 
 July 7 – Exciting Yoshida
 August 28 – Misae Genki
 September 11 – Billy Kidman
 November 10 – Daikokubō Benkei
 December 4 – Azumi Hyuga

Retirements
 Jesse Ventura (1974–1994)
 Curly Moe (1990–1994)
 Ted DiBiase (1975–1994)
 Afa Anoaʻi (1971–1994)
 Ashura Hara (1978–1994)
 Moondog Spike (1978–1994)
 Don Jardine (1955–1994)
 The Great Wojo (1984–1994)
 Jose Luis Rivera (1970-1994)
 Ivan Koloff (1961–1994)
 Mimi Lesseos (1980–1994)
 Jimmy Garvin (1968–1994)
 Mae Weston (1938-June 17, 1994) 
 Mr. T (March 24, 1985 – December 27, 1994)
 Ricky Steamboat (1976-September 1994) (Returned to wrestle in 2009 with WWE and last wrestled in 2010)
 Salman Hashimikov (1989–1994)
 Thunderbolt Patterson (1964–1994)
 Tommy Jammer (1989–1994)
 Troy Graham (September 1976 – 1994)

Deaths 
 January 19 - Johnny Kwango, 73
 February 25 Jersey Joe Walcott, 80
 March 4 – Aníbal, 53
 March 9 - Eddie Creatchman, 66
 May 23 – Ray Candy, 42
 June 26 - Bobby Bonales, 77
 July 1 – George Cannon, 62
 July 4 – Joey Marella, 31
 July 25 - Scott Peterson, 31 
 August 15 - John Bonica, 77
 September 1 – Boris Malenko, 61
 October 27 - Kay Bell, 80
 November 23 – Art Barr, 28
 December 31 - Woody Strode, 80

See also
List of WCW pay-per-view events
List of WWF pay-per-view events
List of ECW supercards and pay-per-view events
List of FMW supercards and pay-per-view events

References

 
professional wrestling